James Anderson Craig (December 1931 – 2 November 1974) was a Unionist politician from Northern Ireland who was a founder member of, and early leading figure in, the Democratic Unionist Party.

Educated at Larne Grammar School, Craig became a foreman for the Courtaulds company. Although outside the establishment of the Ulster Unionist Party, he was nonetheless able to gain local representation as an Independent Unionist, serving as a member of Carrickfergus Borough Council from  1962 onwards, including a spell as deputy mayor from 1973–74. He also served as a member of the Northern Ireland Housing Council from 1973–74.

He attempted to gain election to the Parliament of Northern Ireland for Carrick in the 1969 election but lost to the UUP's Anne Dickson However Craig's profile rose somewhat with the formation of the DUP in 1971. He was a founder member of the party and also sat on its executive until his death, whilst chairing the Carrickfergus branch of the party. As a consequence Craig was elected to the 1973 Assembly for North Antrim and was DUP chief whip.

References

1931 births
1974 deaths
Members of Carrickfergus Borough Council
Democratic Unionist Party politicians
Independent politicians in Northern Ireland
Members of the Northern Ireland Assembly 1973–1974
Place of death missing
People from County Antrim
Date of birth missing
People educated at Larne Grammar School